Sliver is a 1993 American erotic thriller film based on the Ira Levin novel of the same name about the mysterious occurrences in a privately owned New York high-rise sliver building. Phillip Noyce directed the film, from a screenplay by Joe Eszterhas. Because of a major battle with the MPAA (which originally gave the film an NC-17 rating), the filmmakers were forced to make extensive reshoots before release. These reshoots actually necessitated changing the killer's identity. The film stars Sharon Stone, William Baldwin, and Tom Berenger. When he signed on to direct the film, Noyce remarked, "I liked the script a lot. Or at least, I liked the idea of jumping on the Joe Eszterhas bandwagon."

Plot
Carly Norris, a book editor and divorcee in her mid-30s, moves into the exclusive New York City sliver building "113". She meets other tenants including Zeke, a video game designer; Jack, a novelist; Vida, a fashion model who moonlights as a call girl; and Gus, a professor of videography at New York University. They tell Carly that she bears a striking resemblance to Naomi Singer, the previous tenant of her apartment who fell to her death from her balcony.

After running into Zeke numerous times, Carly invites him to her housewarming party. Soon afterwards, they begin a sexual relationship. Meanwhile, Jack starts stalking Carly and warning her about Zeke who he says is "sick". As Jack's behavior becomes more erratic, Gus dies under suspicious circumstances and Vida is murdered, with police suspicion falling on Jack for her death. Zeke reveals to Carly that he is the owner of 113, which he bought with his inheritance from his wealthy father. As owner of 113, Zeke has installed a comprehensive video surveillance system throughout the building, allowing him to spy on all of the tenants from his own secret surveillance room. Through deduction and eventually one of Zeke's secret recordings, Carly learns that Jack killed Naomi in a crime of passion. Jack was jealous of Zeke, who had sexual relations with both Naomi and Vida. Jack attacks Carly in her own apartment, and she accidentally shoots him dead.

Angry at Zeke for withholding evidence in Naomi's murder, and jealous of his liaisons with Naomi and Vida, Carly destroys Zeke's surveillance room, tells him to "get a life", then leaves.

Cast

Production

Location
In the film, the tall and narrow sliver building is located at 113 East 38th Street in Manhattan, placing it at 38th Street and Park Avenue. The actual building used in the film is known as Morgan Court, located at 211 Madison Avenue New York, one block west and two blocks south of the fictional address. The building has since become a condominium development. It was built in 1985 and has 32 floors. While the movie made use of the building's courtyard, the lobby was a Los Angeles film set.

Original ending
In the film's original ending Zeke, instead of Jack, turns out to be the antagonist. He and Carly fly over a Hawaiian volcano when Zeke suddenly confesses his crimes. He then veers the aircraft into the volcano as the end credits roll and leaves the audience to decide whether they survive.

The shooting of the final scene resulted in the crashing of the helicopter. After an investigation the pilot's certificate was temporarily suspended. The footage shot during the flight was destroyed.

Preview audiences disliked the idea of Carly turning immoral. In the helicopter scene, she tells Zeke that the evidence against him is "somewhere safe", implying she is willing to cover up his crimes.

Release and reception
The film premiered on May 19, 1993, at Mann National Theatre in Los Angeles. It was released two days later, on May 21, and received negative reviews from critics. Review aggregate website Rotten Tomatoes reported that 11% of critics have given the film a positive review based on 27 reviews, with an average rating of 3.61/10. The site's critics consensus reads "Sliver is an absurd erotic thriller with technobabble and posits prime Sharon Stone as a professional book nerd." On Metacritic, the film has a weighted average score of 38 out of 100 based on 21 critics, indicating "generally unfavorable reviews".

The main criticisms were that the film provided little in the way of compelling thriller elements, the script  diluted the plot of the novel, the characters were underdeveloped, and the actors were not on form. Critics argued that compared to Sharon Stone's role as a femme fatale in Basic Instinct the year prior, her portrayal in Sliver as a passive character who has to be "lured into sexual intrigue" is unconvincing. The Austin Chronicle stated, "There's no suspense, no drama, no tension, no logic. It makes you appreciate all the craft that went into Basic Instinct".

Another criticism was that the film did not have anything insightful to say on the themes of voyeurism and surveillance. Peter Rainer of the Los Angeles Times wrote, "There’s no emotional pull to the neo-Gothic world in 'Sliver,' where people connect up by video monitor and computer with occasional forays in the flesh. It’s no news that we like to watch. But first you must give us something worth watching." Lastly, many critics also singled out the editing and ending, calling the latter hasty and unconvincing. Audiences polled by CinemaScore gave the film a grade of "C−" on a scale from A+ to F.

MPAA ratings issues
Director Phillip Noyce claimed he had to make 110 edits to the film in order to avoid an NC-17 rating.

According to a Showtime special about the film before the late-night premiere showing of the original NC-17 version, the debate over the NC-17 versus R-rating was linked solely to the display of male frontal nudity. However, when Paramount released the unrated version to video there was no male frontal nudity included, though the sex scenes were considerably more graphic.

Box office
The film debuted at No. 1 at the box office making $12.1 million in 2,093 theaters. By the second week the box office taking dropped to No. 6. Sliver eventually grossed $36.3 million domestically and $87.6 million internationally to a total of $123.9 million worldwide.

Home media
When originally released on VHS, the film was released in both an R-rated and an unrated version (the original NC-17 version). In March 2006, to coincide with the theatrical release of Basic Instinct 2, which starred Stone, Sliver was released on DVD. Only the unrated cut was made commercially available, but the R-rated cut was distributed for rental. There are no special features and although the film was presented theatrically in the 2.35 aspect ratio, the DVD features a matted, 2.10 aspect ratio transfer. In 2013, the film was released on Blu-ray, using the same matted 2.10 aspect ratio version of the R-rated theatrical cut.

Accolades

Soundtrack

See also

 List of film accidents
 List of films featuring surveillance
 The Temp
 The Tenants Downstairs

References

External links
 
 
 
 

 

1993 films
1993 thriller films
1990s erotic thriller films
1990s mystery thriller films
1990s psychological thriller films
1990s serial killer films
American erotic romance films
American erotic thriller films
American mystery thriller films
American serial killer films
Films about security and surveillance
Films based on works by Ira Levin
Films directed by Phillip Noyce
Films produced by Robert Evans
Films scored by Howard Shore
Films set in apartment buildings
Films set in Manhattan
Films shot in Los Angeles
Films shot in New York City
Films with screenplays by Joe Eszterhas
Paramount Pictures films
1990s English-language films
1990s American films